St John the Baptist's Church, East Ham, was a Church of England church dedicated to St John the Baptist in East Ham, east London. It was built in 1866 as a chapel of ease to St Mary Magdalene's Church, then still the main parish church for the area. In 1902 it was converted into a church hall for the new church of St Bartholomew's and in 1925 it was demolished.

References

Former churches in London
Former Church of England church buildings
Church of England church buildings in East Ham
1925 disestablishments in England
1866 establishments in England
East Ham
19th-century Church of England church buildings